Totovo Selo (in Serbian Cyrillic: Тотово Село, in Hungarian: Tóthfalu) is a village in Serbia. It is situated in the Kanjiža municipality, in the North Banat District, Vojvodina province. The village has a Hungarian ethnic majority (99.43%) and its population numbering 709 people (2002 census).

See also
List of places in Serbia
List of cities, towns and villages in Vojvodina

External links
 History of Totovo Selo 

Places in Bačka